The Bureau of Special Investigation (BSI) is the domestic intelligence and security service of the Republic of the Union of Myanmar. BSI is a department of the Ministry of Home Affairs (Myanmar). The bureau has authority to investigate legal offences, including financial crimes, such as inappropriate trading, tax evasion, and government officer corruption allegations. The Director General of BSI is U Maung Maung Kyaw. Its headquarters is in Naypyidaw.

History 
In 1951, the Special Investigation Administrative Board was formed under the direct supervision of the Prime Minister with 315 number of staff in accordance with "The Bureau of Special Investigation Act". In 1963, it was renamed as Bureau of Special Investigation under the administration of the Ministry of Home Affairs.

BSI operates for many laws. These include, but are not limited to —

 Foreign Exchange Regulation Act 1948
 Essential services and Supply Act 1947
 Public Properties protection Act 1947
 Anti-Corruption Act 1948
 Export and Import Supervision (temporary) Act 1948

Organisational structure 
The structure of BSI is:

Headquarter
Administration Division  
Administration
Account 
Training
Law & Prosecution Division 
Law
Prosecution
Information Technology Division 
Information Network
Cyber Crime
Investigation & Financial Division 
Investigation
Financial 
International Affair
Crime Division 
Upper Myanmar
Lower Myanmar
Inspection Division 
Inspection
Complain 
Record
Regions and States (14)
Nay Pyi Taw (Union Territory)(1)

Duties and functions  

 Scrutinizing work 
 Investigation
 Submitting legal opinion on cases 
 Sending up to the court and prosecution
 Collecting and submitting intelligence
 To co-operate for the peace and tranquility of the State and rule of law.

References

External links
 

Government agencies of Myanmar
1951 establishments in Burma
Government agencies established in 1951